Emil Tahirovič (born December 30, 1979 near Ivančna Gorica, Yugoslavia) is an Olympic breaststroke swimmer from Slovenia. He swam for Slovenia at the  2004 Olympics.

He swam for Slovenia at:
Olympics: 2004
Mediterranean Games: 2005, 2009
World Championships: 2003, 2005, 2007, 2009
European Championships: 2004
European SC Championships: 1998, 2003, 2004, 2005, 2006, 2008, 2010

References

1979 births
Living people
Slovenian male swimmers
Male breaststroke swimmers
Swimmers at the 2004 Summer Olympics
Olympic swimmers of Slovenia
People from the Municipality of Ivančna Gorica

Mediterranean Games gold medalists for Slovenia
Mediterranean Games silver medalists for Slovenia
Mediterranean Games bronze medalists for Slovenia
Swimmers at the 2005 Mediterranean Games
Swimmers at the 2009 Mediterranean Games
Mediterranean Games medalists in swimming